Shoot from the Hip is the second studio album by English singer Sophie Ellis-Bextor, released on 27 October 2003 by Polydor Records. It was produced by Gregg Alexander, Matt Rowe, Jeremy Wheatley and Damian LeGassick.

Background
The album was released in Europe in October 2003, but little interest was generated outside the United Kingdom, where the album peaked at number 19 on the UK Albums Chart, with the exception of Switzerland, where it peaked at number 35 on the Swiss Albums Chart. As with the single "Music Gets The Best Of Me" the previous year, the album suffered from being caught in a glut of new releases in the approach to Christmas. Consequently, the album was cited as the singer's least commercially successful album until the release of her fourth studio album, Make a Scene, which reached number 33. The album only produced two singles—"Mixed Up World" and "I Won't Change You"—which reached number 7 and number 9 on the UK Singles Chart, respectively.

Apart from "Murder on the Dancefloor", none of Ellis-Bextor's solo material was released in the US until June 2007, when Shoot from the Hip was added to the American iTunes Store. The songs "I Won't Dance with You" and "The Walls Keep Saying Your Name" feature backing vocals (and one verse of lead vocal on the latter song) from Ellis-Bextor's ex-boyfriend and ex-manager, Andy Boyd, although his name does not appear anywhere in the album credits.

Similarly to "Sparkle" and "Final Move" missing from the worldwide version of Read My Lips, the international edition of Shoot from the Hip does not include the opening track "Making Music", "I Won't Dance with You" nor the hidden track following the end of "Hello, Hello", a cover of Olivia Newton-John's "Physical". The international edition also changes all text on the cover, disc and in the booklet to the shade of turquoise instead of the white used on the UK release.

In 2014, Ellis-Bextor reflected on the album to Attitude magazine, saying: "The second album still had the same feel as the first, but it was maybe a little bit darker. During that record I was going through a bit of a break-up so there are a few break-up songs on there. I wasn't feeling quite as funny and breezy as I was on the first album, but I got it back on album three."

Critical reception

Writing for musicOMH, Sarah McDonnell highlighted the input from Bernard Butler, feeling that different co-writers make the album "patchy in places" and as a result, Ellis-Bextor's songs "sometimes sound a little self-conscious and clunky, almost a little too earnestly conveying her message". Nevertheless, McDonnell also stated "whatever you might think of Sophie Ellis-Bextor, you can't fault her determination" and felt that the album is a "good effort and displays an ambition – and potential – to produce consistent, high quality, intelligent pop music".

K. Ross Hoffman of AllMusic said that while the album "lacks anything nearly as distinctive as her early singles, [...] it's still a solid, perfectly respectable collection of contemporary dance-pop", pointing to "the smooth disco single 'Mixed-Up World' and the chipper 'I Won't Change You'", the latter of which he compared to "Love at First Sight" by Kylie Minogue. Hoffman further judged "there's enough variety to keep the album from sagging, particularly as things turn slightly darker and moodier towards the latter half with the spiky 'You Get Yours' and the odd, haunted 'The Walls Keep Saying Your Name'." However, he felt differently about Butler's contribution, pointing out "the understated ballad 'I Am Not Good at Not Getting What I Want' [...] rounds things out nicely."

While McDonnell compared lead single "Mixed Up World" to material by the Pet Shop Boys, Lucy Davies of BBC Music felt that track is similar to "the best 80s PWL creations". Although singling out the final two tracks (positively comparing the strings in "Hello, Hello" to Andrew Lloyd Webber and questioning why "Physical" is a hidden track when it "encapsulates Sophie; knowingly dead-pan with a little wink tipped at the listener"), Davies used a line from opening song "Making Music" to say the album is largely "making music by numbers"—calling the two songs Boyd contributes vocals on "naff" and the rhyming on "Party in My Head" "cringe worthy". Davies commented that despite the songs on Shoot from the Hip featuring "chewing gum melodies", "Sophie needs to think long and hard about where she's going next."

entertainment.ie held a similar opinion, summarising that even though Shoot from the Hip is a "perfectly efficient pop album", "it still leaves you wondering what Ellis-Bextor could achieve if she really tried."

Track listing

Personnel

Sophie Ellis-Bextor – vocals, keyboards, programming
Paul Brown – additional vocals 
Damian LeGassick – producer, keyboards, bass, programming, string arrangement
Gregg Alexander – producer
Matt Rowe – producer, programming, keyboards
Jeremy Wheatley – producer, mixing, drums
Lewis Taylor – guitar, bass
Rob Davis – guitar
Ali Staton – mixing, recording
Paul Gendler – guitar
Dave Way – mixing
Rik Simpson – guitar, recording, keyboards, programming
Winston Rollins – trombone
Enrico Tomasso – trumpet
Mike Lovatt – trumpet
Guy Pratt – bass

Brio Taliaferro – keyboards, guitar, additional programming
Giulio Pierucci – piano
Paul Stewart – drums
Ross Newell – guitar
Luís Jardim – percussion
James Eller – bass
Steve Sidelnyk – drums, percussion
Monte Pittman – guitar
John Smith – recording
Alex James – bass
Martin Waugh – guitar
Bernard Butler – guitar, keyboards, string arrangement
Andy Maclure – drums
Carl Membrino – keyboards
Pablo Cook – percussion
James Woodrow – guitar

Charts

Certifications

Release history

References

2003 albums
Albums produced by Gregg Alexander
Polydor Records albums
Sophie Ellis-Bextor albums